Sourajit Mohapatra (born 7 September 1968) is a first-class cricketer who played for Orissa in the Ranji Trophy. He was born in Cuttack, Orissa, India.

Mani is a left-hand batsman and right-arm medium bowler. He took a hat-trick in the 1987-88 Ranji Trophy playing for Orissa against Tripura.

Teams
Ranji Trophy: Orissa

See also
 List of hat-tricks in the Ranji Trophy

References

Odisha cricketers
Living people
1968 births
People from Cuttack
Cricketers from Odisha